Frisco Sally Levy (a.k.a. "Véspera de Natal") is a lost 1927 comedy silent film directed by William Beaudine and starring Sally O'Neil and Roy D'Arcy, which was released on April 2, 1927.

Plot
Colleen Lapidowitz (O'Neil) falls in love with an Irish police officer named Patrick Sweeney (Delaney), which is a relief to her Jewish father Isaac (Holtz) and Irish mother Bridget (Price) who have tried to discourage her interest in a sleazy lounge lizard named Stuart Gold (D'Arcy).

Cast
Tenen Holtz as Isaac Solomon Lapidowitz 
Kate Price as Bridget O'Grady Lapidowitz 
Sally O'Neil as Sally Colleen Lapidowitz 
Leon Holmes as Michael Abraham Lapidowitz 
Turner Savage as Isidore Pastrick Lapidowitz 
Helen Levine as Rebecca Patricia Lapidowitz 
Roy D'Arcy as I. Stuart Gold 
Charles Delaney as Patrick Sweeney
Cameo the Dog

Crew
Cedric Gibbons - Art Director
David Townsend - Art Director
René Hubert - Costume Design

References

External links
 
 
 NY Times

1927 films
1927 comedy films
Silent American comedy films
American black-and-white films
1920s English-language films
Films directed by William Beaudine
Metro-Goldwyn-Mayer films
American silent feature films
Lost American films
1927 lost films
Lost comedy films
1920s American films